In philosophy and logic, an immutable truth is an unchanging universal fact or reality that is not influenced by human opinion. According to positivism, observation and experience are the only ways for immutable truths to become fully realized or understood.

See also

Truth

Philosophical logic
Truth